The 2022 Korean Tour was the 12th season of the Korean Tour which awarded Official World Golf Ranking points. All the tournaments had prize funds of at least 500 million won (approximately US$500,000). Nine tournaments had prize funds of 1 billion won ($1,000,000) or more.

European Tour partnership
In December, it was announced by the European Tour that the KPGA had extended their partnership with them and the PGA Tour. As part of the expansion, the leading player on the Korean Tour Order of Merit was given status onto the European Tour for the following season.

Schedule
The following table lists official events during the 2022 season.

Order of Merit
The Order of Merit was titled as the Genesis Points and was based on prize money won during the season, calculated using a points-based system. The leading player on the tour (not otherwise exempt) earned status to play on the 2023 European Tour.

Notes

References

External links

2022 Korean Tour
2022 in golf
2022 in South Korean sport